Thanksgiving is a national holiday celebrated primarily in Canada, Central Africa, and the United States.

Thanksgiving or Thanksgiving Day may also refer to:
 Thanksgiving (Canada)
 Thanksgiving (United States)

Film
 Thanksgiving (2004 film), a 2004 short film
 "Thanksgiving", a fake trailer in Grindhouse

Music
 Thanksgiving (band), a moniker used by Adrian Orange
 "Thanksgiving", a song by Kevin Roth from the Shining Time Station episode Billy's Party
 "Thanksgiving Day", a song by Do As Infinity from Minus V

Television episodes
 "Thanksgiving" (Arrow)
 "Thanksgiving" (Family Guy)
 "Thanksgiving" (Glee)
 "Thanksgiving" (Heroes)
 "Thanksgiving" (Master of None)
 "Thanksgiving" (That '70s Show)

Other uses
 Thanksgiving (novel), a book by Michael Dibdin

See also
 Labor Thanksgiving Day, a Japanese national holiday on November 23 commemorating cooperation between labor and production
 NFL on Thanksgiving Day, a series of American football games played on Thanksgiving Day in the United States
 Songs of thanksgiving, a series of daily prayers in Judaism
 Thanksgiving Candle, a monument in the Republic of Moldova
 Thanksgiving Day Classic, a series of Canadian football games played on Thanksgiving Day in Canada
 Thanksgiving offering, an offering historically made in the Jewish temple
 Victory and Homeland Thanksgiving Day, a Croatian national holiday on August 5 as a memorial to it War of Independence